Gil Semedo Moreira (born October 25, 1974), better known by his stage name Gil Semedo, is a Cape Verdean recording artist, songwriter, businessman, and record producer. He rose to prominence in 1991 following the release of "Menina", the first single from his debut album bearing the same name. Gil is one of the most powerful celebrities in Portuguese speaking Africa, having sold over a million records and creating his own music genre ‘Cabo Swing’ (a combination of traditional Cape Verdean music styles such as Coladeira, Funana and Batuko mixed with zouk, pop and R&B).

Early life
Gil Semedo was born in Santiago, Cape Verde, and at age six moved to the Netherlands, where he still lives. He got his breakthrough in 1990 when he reached the finals on the Dutch talent TV show Sound Mix Show at age fifteen. He would go on to release his first single ‘Menina’ the following year, in 1991.

References

External links
 Official website

1974 births
Living people
21st-century Cape Verdean male singers
Cape Verdean emigrants to the Netherlands
People from Santa Catarina, Cape Verde
Coladeira singers
20th-century Cape Verdean male singers